Dame Janet Elizabeth Murray Kershaw  (née Gammie; born 11 December 1943) is an English nurse who served as professor of nursing and dean at the School of Nursing and Midwifery, University of Sheffield from 1999 to 2006.

She served as Head of the Manchester College of Midwifery and Nursing and the Director of Nursing Education at the Stockport, Tameside and Glossop College of Nursing.

Kershaw received an honorary doctorate from Manchester University in 1995 in recognition of her contribution to nursing education. Professor Kershaw was created Dame Commander of the Order of the British Empire in 1998 for services to nursing and nursing education. Her international consultancy work for the Dept of Health included projects in Colombia and China on the modernization agenda for nursing, in Malta on the development of an EU curriculum of nursing, in Poland on Nursing Accession to the European community and for the commonwealth Office on Managed  Migration.Other commitments to the Department of Health included their Leadership Project advising on how the program developed ethnic minority nurses for leadership positions. 

She was President of the Royal College of Nursing from 1994 to 1998, was made a Fellow of the Royal College of Nursing in 2001  and was once employed as their education adviser. She was also St John Ambulance's chief nursing and social care officer.

Personal life
Kershaw lives in Manchester and is married to historian Sir Ian Kershaw, with whom she has two sons.

References

1943 births
Academics of the University of Sheffield
English nurses
British nursing administrators
Dames Commander of the Order of the British Empire
Place of birth missing (living people)
Living people
People in health professions from Manchester
Fellows of the Royal College of Nursing
Presidents of the Royal College of Nursing
Commanders of the Order of St John
Wives of knights
British nurses